I Am Legion may refer to:

Comics
I Am Legion (comics) (French: Je suis légion), French comic book series

Film and TV
I Am Legion (Justice League Unlimited episode)
 I Am Legion, film by Nacho Cerdà based on the comic book

Music
I Am Legion (album), Noisia and Foreign Beggars album
I Am Legion (Witchery album), Witchery album

See also
Legion (demons)
Legion (disambiguation)